The 2020 Forge FC season was the second season in the history of Forge FC. Forge were the defending league champions, having defeated Cavalry FC in the 2019 Canadian Premier League Finals. Before the start of the season, Forge announced that 18 players from the previous season would be returning in 2020. In addition to the domestic league, the club competed in the  CONCACAF League, advancing to the quarter-finals for the first time.

On September 19, Forge defeated HFX Wanderers FC 2–0 in the 2020 Canadian Premier League Final to win their second consecutive league title. As champions, they qualified for the 2020 Canadian Championship Final and the 2021 CONCACAF League.

Squad 
As of August 14, 2020

Transfers

In

Draft picks 
Forge FC selected the following players in the 2019 CPL–U Sports Draft. Draft picks are not automatically signed to the team roster. Only those who are signed to a contract will be listed as transfers in.

Out

Competitions
Matches are listed in Hamilton local time: Eastern Daylight Time (UTC−4) from April to October and Eastern Standard Time (UTC-5) otherwise.

Overview

Canadian Premier League

First stage

Table

Results by match

Matches

Group stage

Table

Results by round

Matches

Final

CONCACAF League

Preliminary round

Round of 16

Quarterfinals

Play-in round

Canadian Championship 

The 2020 Canadian Championship was played as a one-game final between Forge as the CPL Champions and Toronto FC as the winner of a head-to-head series between Canadian teams from Major League Soccer. It was delayed until June 2022 due to scheduling difficulties related to the COVID-19 pandemic. Forge ultimately lost the final in a penalty shoot-out following a 1–1 draw.

Statistics

Squad and statistics 

|-

  

 
 

 
 
 
 
 
 
 
 
 
 
 
 
 
 
|-
|}

Top scorers 
{| class="wikitable sortable alternance"  style="font-size:85%; text-align:center; line-height:14px; width:85%;"
|-
!width=10|Rank
!width=10|Nat.
! scope="col" style="width:275px;"|Player
!width=10|Pos.
!width=80|Canadian Premier League
!width=80|CONCACAF League
!width=80|TOTAL
|-
|1|||| Daniel Krutzen || DF || 2 || 2 || 4
|-
|rowspan=3|2|||| Kyle Bekker || MF || 3 || 0 || 3
|-
||| Alexander Achinioti-Jönsson || MF || 3 || 0 || 3
|-
||| Anthony Novak || FW || 2 || 1 || 3
|-
|rowspan=4|5|||| Chris Nanco || FW || 2 || 0 || 2
|-
||| Paolo Sabak || MF || 2 || 0 || 2
|-
||| David Choinière || FW || 1 || 1 || 2
|-
||| Molham Babouli || FW || 1 || 1 || 2
|-
|rowspan=2|9|||| Kwame Awuah || DF || 1 || 0 || 1
|-
||| Maxim Tissot || MF || 1 || 0 || 1
|-
|colspan="4"|Own goals || 1 || 0 || 1
|-
|- class="sortbottom"
| colspan="4"|Totals||19||5||24

Top assists 
{| class="wikitable sortable alternance"  style="font-size:85%; text-align:center; line-height:14px; width:85%;"
|-
!width=10|Rank
!width=10|Nat.
!width=275|Player
!width=10|Pos.
!width=80|Canadian Premier League
!width=80|CONCACAF League
!width=80|TOTAL
|-
|1|||| Molham Babouli || FW || 2 || 1 || 3
|-
|rowspan=2|2|||| Paolo Sabak || MF || 2 || 0 || 2
|-
||| Maxim Tissot || DF || 2 || 0 || 2
|-
|rowspan=4|4|||| David Choinière || MF || 1 || 0 || 1
|-
||| Kadell Thomas || FW || 1 || 0 || 1
|-
||| Kyle Bekker || MF || 1 || 0 || 1
|-
||| Dominic Samuel || DF || 0 || 1 || 1
|- class="sortbottom"
| colspan="4"|Totals||9||2||11

Clean sheets 
{| class="wikitable sortable alternance"  style="font-size:85%; text-align:center; line-height:14px; width:85%;"
|-
!width=10|Rank
!width=10|Nat.
! scope="col" style="width:275px;"|Player
!width=80|Canadian Premier League
!width=80|CONCACAF League
!width=80|TOTAL
|-
|1|||| Triston Henry || 5 || 0 || 5
|-
|- class="sortbottom"
| colspan="3"|Totals||5||0||5

Disciplinary record 
{| class="wikitable sortable alternance"  style="font-size:85%; text-align:center; line-height:14px; width:85%;"
|-
!rowspan="2" width=10|No.
!rowspan="2" width=10|Pos.
!rowspan="2" width=10|Nat.
!rowspan="2" scope="col" style="width:275px;"|Player
!colspan="2" width=80|Canadian Premier League
!colspan="2" width=80|CONCACAF League
!colspan="2" width=80|TOTAL
|-
! !!  !!  !!  !!  !! 
|-
|2||DF|||| Jonathan Grant ||2||0||1||1||3||1
|-
|4||DF|||| Dominic Samuel ||2||0||1||0||3||0
|-
|5||DF|||| Daniel Krutzen ||1||0||0||0||1||0
|-
|6||DF|||| Kwame Awuah ||1||0||0||0||1||0
|-
|9||FW|||| Marcel Zajac ||2||0||0||0||2||0
|-
|10||MF||||Kyle Bekker ||1||0||1||1||2||1
|-
|11||FW|||| Chris Nanco ||0||0||1||0||1||0
|-
|13||MF||||Alexander Achinioti-Jönsson ||1||0||0||0||1||0
|-
|14||DF|||| David Edgar ||5||0||1||0||6||0
|-
|15||DF|||| Maxim Tissot ||1||0||1||0||2||0
|-
|16||DF|||| Klaidi Cela ||1||0||0||0||1||0
|-
|17||FW|||| Kadell Thomas ||1||0||0||0||1||0
|-
|19||FW|||| Molham Babouli ||0||0||1||0||1||0
|-
|20||FW||||Gabriel Balbinotti ||1||0||0||0||1||0
|-
|24||MF|||| Paolo Sabak ||1||0||0||0||1||0
|- class="sortbottom"
| colspan="4"|Totals||20||0||7||2||27||2

Honours

Canadian Premier League Awards

References

External links 
Official site

2020
2020 Canadian Premier League
Canadian soccer clubs 2020 season